West Pioneer Glacier is a glacier located on the central coast of Baffin Island, Nunavut, Canada.

References

Glaciers of Baffin Island
Arctic Cordillera